Kuhsar Shahran Park is a forest park located in northern Tehran, Iran. It covers an area of about 10 square kilometers, and includes ramps and facilities for cycling and skating. Kuhsar Shahran Park has 2 main entrances, One on Kohsar Boulevard and another on Shahran Boulevard. Also, Kouhsar Shahran is Tehran's largest forest park. Due to the clean air, many people in Tehran come to Kuhsar Shahran Park for walking and sport activities.

Structures and facilities

Recreational and sports facilities 
Recreational and sports facilities in Kuhsar Shahran Park:

 Motorcycling Cycle
 Paragliding
 Children's Playground
 Gazebo
 And other

Transportation 
Kuhsar Shahran Park has 2 main entrances, One on Kuhsar Boulevard (Western entrance) and another on Shahran Boulevard (Eastern entrance).

Public transport 
People will easily reach the park via Tehran Metro Line 6. Kuhsar metro station is located near the park. Also, Kuhsar Bus Station is located next to Kuhsar Park.

Gallery

External links 

 Route from google map
Kuhsar Park, Tehran's largest forest park

References 

Parks in Tehran